Kuhn Island is a coastal island in Hochstetter Bay, eastern Greenland. There are coal deposits on the island. 

The island was discovered by the Second German North Polar Expedition (1869-1870) and is named after Franz Kuhn von Kuhnenfeld, the Austro-Hungarian minister of war, who was a patron of the expedition's cartographer, Julius von Payer.

Geography
This island lies to the north of Wollaston Foreland, separated from Thomas Thomsen Land in the mainland by a narrow sound, the Fligely Fjord. The Lindeman Fjord has its mouth to the southwest and the Hochstetter Bay of the Greenland Sea lies to the east. The mouths of Ardencaple Fjord and Grandjean Fjord open to the north.

The islands that are located further off the shore in the bay are Shannon Island to the NE and the Pendulum Islands to the SE.

See also
List of islands of Greenland

References

Uninhabited islands of Greenland